Sir Frederick Shaw, 3rd Baronet (11 December 1799 – 30 June 1876) was an Irish Conservative MP in the United Kingdom Parliament, and a judge. 

He was the second son of Colonel Sir Robert Shaw, Bt of Bushy Park, Dublin and his first wife Maria Wilkinson, daughter and heiress of Abraham Wilkinson. He became a member of the Privy Council of Ireland on 15 January 1835. Shaw became the 3rd Baronet on 19 February 1869 on the death of his elder brother Robert.

He attended Trinity College Dublin (BA and MA 1832, LLB and LLD 1841), and subsequently Brasenose College, University of Oxford (BA). He became a member of King's Inns, Dublin and was called to the Irish Bar in 1822. He held the judicial offices of Recorder of Dublin, (a part-time municipal judge) and also of Dundalk. His status as a judge did not debar him from sitting in the House of Commons, although the propriety of the dual role was frequently questioned, and in 1832 there was an unsuccessful move in the Commons to make him vacate the Recordership. On the other hand, he was praised as a hardworking and conscientious magistrate.

He married on 16 March 1819, Thomasine Emily, the daughter of Hon. George Jocelyn, MP, of Newport, County Tipperary, Member of Parliament for Dundalk and Thomasine Bowen, and granddaughter of Robert Jocelyn, 1st Earl of Roden. They had eight children. Thomasine died in 1859.

He was MP for Dublin City in 1830–1831 and 1832. He represented Dublin University, 1832–1848. He resigned his seat by becoming Steward of the Chiltern Hundreds. He was generally regarded as the leader of the Irish Conservative Party.

A devout member of the Church of Ireland and a member of the Orange Order, he was sometimes accused of bias against Roman  Catholics, and comments he reportedly made on the subject in 1835 led to a heated debate in the House of Commons, at which he was present and defended himself vigorously in the face of attacks by Daniel O'Connell among others. 
His fellow MPs noted that while his normal speaking style was "cold and monotonous", he invariably became fierce and passionate when speaking of religion.

He lived in Kimmage Manor right up to his death in 1876. Upon succeeding to the Baronetcy he decided to stay in Kimmage which he had extended and developed rather than move to the other family residence in Terenure.

Death
He died on 30 June 1876 and was interred in Saint Mary's Church, Crumlin, Dublin. His eldest son, Robert Shaw (1821–1895), succeeded to his baronetcy.

Relatives
He was a distant relative of the writer George Bernard Shaw, whose father was a cousin of Frederick Shaw.

Flora Shaw, Lady Lugard, DBE was a grandchild, daughter of his son, General George Shaw

References
 Who's Who of British Members of Parliament: Vol. I 1832–1885, edited by Michael Stenton (The Harvester Press 1976)

Notes

External links
 

1799 births
1876 deaths
Baronets in the Baronetage of the United Kingdom
Alumni of Trinity College Dublin
Members of the Parliament of the United Kingdom for County Dublin constituencies (1801–1922)
Members of the Parliament of the United Kingdom for Dublin University
Members of the Privy Council of Ireland
UK MPs 1830–1831
UK MPs 1831–1832
UK MPs 1832–1835
UK MPs 1835–1837
UK MPs 1837–1841
UK MPs 1841–1847
UK MPs 1847–1852
Irish Conservative Party MPs
People from Templeogue
Burials at Mount Jerome Cemetery and Crematorium
Recorders of Dublin
Kimmage
Alumni of King's Inns